The 2019 Torneo Internazionale Femminile Antico Tiro a Volo was a professional tennis tournament played on outdoor clay courts. It was the eleventh edition of the tournament which was part of the 2019 ITF Women's World Tennis Tour. It took place in Rome, Italy between 10 and 16 June 2019.

Singles main-draw entrants

Seeds

 1 Rankings are as of 27 May 2019.

Other entrants
The following players received wildcards into the singles main draw:
  Elisabetta Cocciaretto
  Cristiana Ferrando
  Lisa Sabino
  Lucrezia Stefanini

The following player received entry using a protected ranking:
  Anna Tatishvili

The following player received entry as a special exempt:
  Stephanie Wagner

The following players received entry from the qualifying draw:
  Nicoleta Dascălu
  Cristina Dinu
  Paula Cristina Gonçalves
  Tatiana Pieri
  Lara Salden
  Dalila Spiteri

The following player received entry as a lucky loser:
  Ulrikke Eikeri

Champions

Singles

 Sara Errani def.  Barbara Haas, 6–1, 6–4

Doubles

 Elisabetta Cocciaretto /  Nicoleta Dascălu def.  Carolina Alves /  Elena Bogdan, 7–5, 4–6, [10–7]

References

External links
 2019 Torneo Internazionale Femminile Antico Tiro a Volo at ITFtennis.com
 Official website 

2019 ITF Women's World Tennis Tour
2019 in Italian tennis